Haltenbank was a German fishing trawler that was requisitioned by the Kriegsmarine in the Second World War for use as a Vorpostenboot. She served as V 408 Haltenbank. She was torpedoed and sunk in the Bay of Biscay in February 1943.

Description
The engine was made by Deschimag Seebeckwerft, Wesermünde, Germany. It was rated at 128nhp. The engine powered a single screw propeller driven via a low pressure turbine, double reduction gearing and a hydraulic coupling.

History
The ship was built as yard number 522 by Deschimag Seekbeckwerft, Wesermünde for the Deutsche Hochseefischerei AG., Wesermünde. She was launched in September 1934 and completed on 24 October. The fishing boat registration PG 501 was allocated. She was allocated the Code Letters DEZJ.

Haltenbank was requisitioned by the Kriegsmarine on 20 September 1939 for use as a vorpostenboot. She was allocated to 4 Vorpostenflotille as V 408 Haltenbank. On 19 February 1943, she was torpedoed and sunk in the Bay of Biscay off Bilbao, Spain by the United States Navy submarine , which V 404 Baden counterattacked and damaged.

References

Sources

1934 ships
Ships built in Bremen (state)
Fishing vessels of Germany
Steamships of Germany
World War II merchant ships of Germany
Auxiliary ships of the Kriegsmarine
Maritime incidents in February 1943
Ships sunk by American submarines
World War II shipwrecks in the Atlantic Ocean
Shipwrecks in the Bay of Biscay